Brian Hill (born November 9, 1995) is an American football running back for the St. Louis BattleHawks of the XFL. Hill played college football for the Wyoming Cowboys, and he was drafted by the Atlanta Falcons in the fifth round of the 2017 NFL Draft. He has also played for the Cincinnati Bengals.

Early years
Hill attended and played high school football at Belleville High School-West.

College career
Hill attended and played college football at Wyoming from 2014–2016.

As a freshman in 2014, he rushed for 796 yards and seven touchdowns. On November 1, 2014, against Fresno State, he had 23 carries for 281 rushing yards and two rushing touchdowns to go along with three receptions for 106 yards. As a sophomore, he had four games (Eastern Michigan, Appalachian State, Utah State, and UNLV) in which he rushed for over 200 yards. During the 2015 regular season, Hill had 1,631 rushing yards (seventh among NCAA Division I FBS players) on 281 carries for an average of 5.8 yards per carry to go along with six rushing touchdowns. On November 18, 2015, Hill was named a finalist for the Doak Walker Award. He is Wyoming's first 1,000-yard rusher since 2008. He broke Ryan Christopherson's single-season Wyoming record of 1,455 yards set in 1994.
On Saturday, October 22, 2016, at Nevada, Hill rushed for a career-high 289 yards and scored a career-high three touchdowns. Overall, he finished the 2016 season with 1,860 rushing yards and 22 rushing touchdowns.

College statistics

Professional career

Atlanta Falcons
Hill was drafted by the Atlanta Falcons in the fifth round, 156th overall, in the 2017 NFL Draft. He was the 16th running back selected in that year's draft, as well as one of 2 Wyoming players selected (the other being Chase Roullier). He was waived by the Falcons on October 14, 2017 and was re-signed to the practice squad.

Cincinnati Bengals
On November 14, 2017, Hill was signed by the Cincinnati Bengals off the Falcons' practice squad. He finished his rookie season with 11 carries for 37 yards to go along with two receptions for 36 yards.

On September 1, 2018, Hill was waived by the Bengals.

Atlanta Falcons (second stint)
On September 3, 2018, Hill was signed to the Atlanta Falcons' practice squad. He was promoted to the active roster on September 11, 2018. In Week 16, against the Carolina Panthers, he had eight carries for 115 rushing yards. Overall, he finished the 2018 season with 20 carries for 157 rushing yards.

In the 2019 season, Hill appeared in 12 games and finished with 323 rushing yards and two rushing touchdowns to go along with 10 receptions for 69 receiving yards and one receiving touchdown.

On March 16, 2020, the Falcons placed an original-round restricted free agent tender on Hill. He signed the one-year contract on April 18, 2020.

In Week 17 against the Tampa Bay Buccaneers, Hill recorded 136 yards from scrimmage during the 44–27 loss.

Tennessee Titans
On May 6, 2021, Hill signed with the Tennessee Titans. He was placed on injured reserve on August 29, 2021. He was released on September 2.

Cleveland Browns
Hill was signed to the Cleveland Browns' practice squad on November 9, 2021. Hill was elevated to the Browns' active roster on November 13, 2021. He was released on November 30.

San Francisco 49ers
On December 8, 2021, Hill was signed to the San Francisco 49ers practice squad. He was promoted to the active roster on December 23. He was waived on January 1, 2022, and re-signed to the practice squad. His contract expired when the teams season ended on January 30, 2022.

BC Lions
On June 20, 2022, Hill signed with the BC Lions of the Canadian Football League (CFL). He made the practice roster, but was eventually released on September 22, 2022.

St. Louis BattleHawks
Hill was selected in the 6th round of the 2023 XFL Skill Players Draft, by the St. Louis BattleHawks.

References

External links
Wyoming Cowboys bio

1995 births
Living people
American football running backs
Atlanta Falcons players
BC Lions players
Cincinnati Bengals players
Cleveland Browns players
Players of American football from Illinois
San Francisco 49ers players
Sportspeople from Belleville, Illinois
St. Louis BattleHawks players
Tennessee Titans players
Wyoming Cowboys football players